Papilio cacicus is a Neotropical butterfly of the family Papilionidae first described by Hippolyte Lucas in 1852. It is found in Colombia, Venezuela, Ecuador and Peru.

Habitat

Papilio cacicus is an indicator species of primary mountain forest for instance in the Cordillera de la Costa montane forests in Venezuela and more generally in the tropical Andes.

Subspecies
Papilio cacicus cacicus (Colombia, Venezuela)
Papilio cacicus nesrinae Koçak, 1983 (western Colombia)
Papilio cacicus inca Rothschild & Jordan, 1906 (Peru)
Papilio cacicus upanensis Talbot, 1929 (Ecuador)
Papilio cacicus mendozaensis Bollino & Sala, 1994 (Peru)

Taxonomy
Papilio cacicus is a member of the homerus species group. The members of this clade are
Papilio cacicus H. Lucas, 1852
Papilio euterpinus Salvin & Godman, 1868
Papilio garamas (Geyer, [1829])
Papilio homerus Fabricius, 1793
Papilio menatius (Hübner, [1819])
Papilio warscewiczii Hopffer, 1865

Papilio cacicus  is in the subgenus Pterourus Scopoli, 1777 which also includes the species groups: troilus species group, glaucus species group, the zagreus species group and the scamander species group.

References

Lewis, H. L., 1974 Butterflies of the World  Page 24, figure 15 (underside).

External links
Butterflies of America types

cacicus
Papilionidae of South America
Butterflies described in 1852